Brian Sell (born April 11, 1978) is a retired American long-distance runner who specialized in various long-distance track events before specializing as a marathoner in his professional career with Hansons-Brooks Distance Project. Sell represented the United States at the 2008 Summer Olympics in the men's marathon. He attended Saint Francis University in Loretto, Pennsylvania, where he ran on the Saint Francis University cross country team.

Running career

High school
Sell attended Northern Bedford High School, where he participated in multiple sports. In addition to running he was a wrestler as well as a wide receiver on the football team, and did not join the track team until his sophomore year. His best track times by the end of his senior year were 4:28 (min:sec) in the 1600-meter and 10:06 in the 3200-meter.

Collegiate
Sell began at Messiah College, then transferred to study at Saint Francis University, where his athletic career reached new heights. He represented SFU at the 2000 NCAA Division I XC Championships, where he ran the 10K in 31:17.1 and was an All-American.

Post-collegiate
Sell placed third overall in the 2008 USA Olympic Team Trials Marathon in Central Park, New York City on November 3, 2007, with a time of 2:11:40, earning him a spot, along with Ryan Hall and Dathan Ritzenhein, on the U.S. men's marathon team at the 2008 Summer Olympics in Beijing, where he finished the Olympic Marathon in 22nd place with a time of 2:16:7.

Sell ran the 2009 New York Marathon, which he and his coach have indicated was his last competitive race.

Achievement Chronology
 2002 – 3rd at USATF Fall Cross Country Championships
 2002 – Chiba Ekiden Relay Team
 2002 – 8th at USATF Championships 10K (road)
 2002 – 8th at USATF Championships 8K (road)
 2002 – 4th at USATF Championships 7 mile (road)
 2003 – 13th at USA 2004 Olympic Trials Marathon (after leading through 21 miles)
 2003 – 25th at IAAF World Half Marathon Championships (1st American)
 2003 – 2nd at USATF Championships 20K (road) (5th fastest American 20k time ever 59:18)
 2003 – 8th at USATF Championships 8K (road)
 2004/2005 – 1st place LaSalle Bank Shamrock Shuffle
 2005 – 2nd at USATF Championships 10 mile (road)
 2005 – 1st place USATF 25K
 2005 – 9th at World Championships marathon, Helsinki, Finland
 2006 – 1st place USA Half Marathon Championships
 2006 – 4th place Boston Marathon in a PR 2:10:55
 2006 – Reed’s Lake 10K Champion 29:02
 2006 – Chicago Distance Classic Champion 1:04:25
 2006 – 6th place Chicago Marathon in a PR 2:10:47
 2007 – 1st place Sauder's Egg Run
 2007 – 1st place USATF 25K Championships
 2007 – 3rd place USA 2008 Olympic Trials Marathon (qualifying for Olympic team)
 2008 – 1st place Miami Half Marathon,  1:03:46
 2008 – 22nd place, 3rd American at the Men's Olympic Marathon, 2:16:07
 2008 – 1st place Rock 'n Roll San Antonio Half Marathon, 1:02:50
 2009 – 5th place 2009 USA Half Marathon Championships, 1:02:36

References

External links
 USATF 2008 U.S. Olympic Team Trials Marathon official website
 Hansons-Brooks Distance Project official website

1978 births
Living people
American male long-distance runners
Saint Francis University alumni
Athletes (track and field) at the 2008 Summer Olympics
Olympic track and field athletes of the United States
American male marathon runners